The Ministry of Communications was a department of the Government of Spain active during the Second Republic and the Civil War. Originally, this ministry had powers on the postal service, telegraphs, telephone and radiocommunications. During the first years of the republic its powers gradually growth, assuming competences on aeronautics, navigation and air transport. Subsequently, in closer times to the civil war, the department assumed powers over the merchant marine and other transports.

History 
The Ministry of Communications is a unique department of the Second Spanish Republic. It has been not use in any other time. It was created on 15 April 1931, a day after the proclamation of the republic, and it assumed the powers of the Directorate-General for the Postal Service and Telegraphs of the Ministry of Home Affairs. From this ministry also assumed the competences relating the link between the Government and the Compañía Telefónica Nacional de España. Diego Martínez Barrio was the first Minister.

Months later, in December 1931, minister Martínez Barrio left the portfolio and Santiago Casares Quiroga, Minister of Home Affairs, assumed the office temporarily until April 1932 when the Department was abolished and the Undersecretariat of Communications (main department of the Ministry) was transferred to the Ministry led by Casares Quiroga. The Department of Communications was recreated in 1933 with Miquel Santaló i Parvorell as its minister.

The Ministry merged in September 1935 with the Ministry of Public Works under the premiership of Joaquín Chapaprieta until February 1936. Briefly that year, under the premierships of Manuel Azaña, Augusto Barcía Trelles, Santiago Casares Quiroga, Diego Martínez Barrio and José Giral, both departments split again and ministry was renamed Ministry of Communications and Merchant Marine. In September that year, the ministry was renamed just Ministry of Communications and two months later it was renamed again "of Communications and Merchant Marine". In May 1937, it was merged again with Public Works.

In April 1938, the ministries were split again and the Communications one assumed powers on transports, being renamed as Ministry of Communications and Transport until March 1939 when it was merged again with Public Works. After the end of the Civil War in April 1939, the dictator Franco did not use this department and the communications powers were part of the Ministry of Home Affairs during all the dictatorship.

During the last cabinets of Adolfo Suárez, the government of Calvo-Sotelo and the first cabinets of Felipe González, the powers were assumed by the Ministry of Transport until 1991, when they were transferred to the Ministry of Public Works and nowadays they remain in this ministry. However, the powers relating to telecommunications are in the Ministry of Economy.

Ministers

References 

1931 establishments in Spain
1939 disestablishments in Spain
Defunct departments of the Spanish Government
Communications ministries
Second Spanish Republic